"Colorful" is Jun Shibata's 15th single. It was released on September 12, 2007 and peaked at #15.

Track listing
Colorful (カラフル; Colorful)
Moufu no naka (もうふのなか; Inside the Blanket)

Charts

External links
https://web.archive.org/web/20161030094458/http://www.shibatajun.com/— Shibata Jun Official Website

2007 singles
Jun Shibata songs
2007 songs
Victor Entertainment singles